Tha Raeng is a khwaeng (subdistrict) of Bang Khen District, in Bangkok, Thailand. In 2020, it had a total population of 97,658 people.

References

Subdistricts of Bangkok
Bang Khen district